Michael Finnell is a film producer active from the 1970s to the present. He has produced several horror-comedy films, particularly with the director Joe Dante. Finnell worked for the American producer Roger Corman before emerging as a producer in his own right.

His first films were Avalanche (1978) and Rock 'n' Roll High School (1979), with Corman. One of the first without Corman was the movie Airplane!, in which he was listed in the end credits as "generally in charge of a lot of things". Working with Dante, Finnell then produced the modest hit The Howling in 1981 and the blockbuster Gremlins in 1984. Dante and the special effects designer Chris Walas have said that Finnell's producing style was influenced by Corman, in that Finnell was very concerned about budgeting and wanted to make sure even cheap purchases contributed to the final film. The anecdote Walas told was of Finnell engaging in long phone calls over the purchase of a kitchen knife to be used in Gremlins.

Finnell continued to produce several of Dante's films, including Explorers (1985), The 'Burbs (1989), Gremlins 2: The New Batch (1990), Matinee (1993) and Small Soldiers (1998).  Without Dante, Finnell's films include Milk Money (1994) and Teaching Mrs. Tingle (1999). For one of his films produced without Dante, Newsies, Finnell was nominated for a Razzie Award for Worst Picture.

Filmography
He was a producer in all films unless otherwise noted.

Film

Miscellaneous crew

As an actor

Production manager

Thanks

Television

Miscellaneous crew

References

External links 
 

Living people
American film producers
Year of birth missing (living people)